Stars is the fourth album by British-based pop/soul/jazz band Simply Red, released in September 1991. Five singles were released from the album, including the UK top ten hits "Stars" and "For Your Babies". The album was a worldwide success, particularly in the band's home country where it has been certified twelve times platinum and was the best-selling album of the year in the UK for both 1991 and 1992, the first album to be the best-seller in two consecutive years since Simon & Garfunkel's Bridge over Troubled Water in 1970–71. As of July 2016 it is the 14th best-selling album of all time in the UK.

The album was on the shortlist of nominees for the 1992 Mercury Prize. In 2000 Q placed Stars at number 80 in its list of "The 100 Greatest British Albums Ever".

In 2000 it was voted number 258 in Colin Larkin's All Time Top 1000 Albums.

Composition and recording
Recording for the album originally began in Paris in August 1990, but the initial sessions did not go well: the equipment in the studio did not live up to expectations, and with the Gulf War having just started and dominating television news reports, the band found the atmosphere in the bunker-like studios oppressive and not conducive to making music. The group moved to the more relaxed surroundings of Venice to resume recording in the Condulmer Studios.

Simply Red's leader and singer Mick Hucknall had wanted the album to have a less electronic and more soulful sound than their previous work, and had recruited programmer Gota after hearing his work with Soul II Soul. Hucknall did not realise that Gota was also a drummer until he heard him jamming on the drum kit one evening in Venice, after which Gota also became the band's full-time drummer. The songs had been written over the previous year: "Something Got Me Started" and "Stars" had been written on the road during the group's previous tour. "Thrill Me" was based on a riff that McIntyre had come up with, while Hucknall described "Wonderland" as "probably the most political song I've written", documenting his dissatisfaction with the British Conservative government of the time.

Artwork
The album cover features a photograph of singer Hucknall in the Californian desert, wearing a Native American painted cloak that he had bought in Spain. Hucknall had insisted that in the shot he would be wearing the cloak and nothing else, displaying his bare legs. However, when photographer Zanna showed the photographs to EastWest Records, they were concerned that Hucknall's bare legs would offend sensibilities in the US, and Zanna had to digitally retouch the picture using a test photograph of her assistant's jeans-covered legs.

Release
Stars was released 30 September 1991 and debuted at number one on the UK Albums Chart. It sold around 150,000 copies in its first week and faced competition from Prince's Diamonds and Pearls and Tina Turner's greatest hits collection Simply the Best. In one year, the album had sold 2.4 million copies in the UK.

Stars was re-issued in 2008 as a Collector's Edition 2CD with bonus DVD digipack.

Critical reception

The album received mixed reviews in the UK. The alternative music magazines were cool towards the record: in the NME Andrew Collins dismissed Stars as "an exercise in no-style over no-content... this is the sound of some technicians desperately fanning some smouldering ashes for people with central heating", while in Melody Maker Caroline Sullivan simply stated that "within his strictly-defined oeuvre – sleek, airbrushed music best described as soulette – [Hucknall]'s miles ahead of the competition... Nor, on an objective level, can Stars be faulted... This is a pleasant album, the sleeve is pretty, and now, at least, you've got a Christmas present for Gran."

However, reviews from newspaper critics and other magazines were more positive. In The Guardian Adam Sweeting wrote that "the new songs sound relaxed, refreshed and satisfyingly cohesive... Easy to listen to but not easy listening, Stars keeps shining", while The Independents Andy Gill was similarly impressed, observing that "Hucknall's socialist soul-boy's conviction and his determination to write songs with stings in their tales place Simply Red several notches above the rest of the smooth soul genre... And in simple evocations of love like 'Thrill Me' or 'For Your Babies', the spark of honesty sets them above the superficial, insincere protestations of love that dominate modern soul music". In Q Ian Cranna hailed the album as "a long overdue change in musical direction, with Hucknall for the most part abandoning his undoubtedly sincere but inevitably fruitless attempts to re-create himself as a soul singer. Instead he's eased Simply Red down a couple of gears into a more relaxed and flowing style which owes as much towards current hip hop-inspired club rhythms as it does to old-style soul or funk." He ended his review by describing Stars as "Simply Red's most accessible and danceable work to date".

In his retrospective review for AllMusic, Stephen Thomas Erlewine called Stars "Simply Red's best album since their debut. It's smoother and more polished than their previous work, yet Mick Hucknall is singing better than ever and his songwriting is improving... Having absorbed his pop, soul, and reggae influences, Hucknall is now successfully writing songs in his own style, something that, with the exception of 'Holding Back the Years', he hadn't managed previously."

The album was voted the second-worst record ever made in a 1998 Melody Maker poll of pop stars, DJs, and journalists.

Track listing

Original release
All songs written and composed by Mick Hucknall, except where noted.
 "Something Got Me Started" (Hucknall, Fritz McIntyre) – 4:01
 "Stars" – 4:08
 "Thrill Me" (Hucknall, McIntyre) – 5:04
 "Your Mirror" – 3:59
 "She's Got It Bad" – 3:33
 "For Your Babies" – 4:17
 "Model" – 3:46
 "How Could I Fall" – 4:45
 "Freedom" – 3:52 
 "Wonderland" – 3:49

2008 Collector's Edition bonus tracks

Disc one (CD) – extra tracks
Robert Johnson Sessions
<li>"Come On in My Kitchen" (Robert Johnson) – 1:32 
<li>"Ramblin' on My Mind" (Johnson) – 2:11
<li>"Me and the Devil Blues" (Johnson) – 2:03
<li>"When You've Got A Good Friend" (Johnson) – 2:00
Live at Hamburg (23 February 1992)
<li>"Sad Old Red" (Hucknall) – 5:58
<li>"More" (Hucknall) – 4:14
<li>"Something Got Me Started" (Hucknall, McIntyre) – 4:12
<li>"Thrill Me" (Hucknall, McIntyre) – 5:09
<li>"Your Mirror" (Hucknall) – 3:57
<li>"She's Got It Bad" (Hucknall) – 3:45

Disc two (CD) – Mixes
 "Stars" [PM-ized Mix] – 4:10 
 "For Your Babies" [Edition Francais] – 4:06 
 "Something Got Me Started" [E-Smoove's Late Night Mix] – 8:00 
 "Thrill Me" [Steppin' Razor Mix] – 6:37 
 "Freedom" [Perfecto Mix] – 6:24 
 "Stars" [Comprende Mix] – 6:38 
 "Something Got Me Started" [Hurley's 7" Mix] – 3:56 
 "Thrill Me" [Connoisseurs Mix] – 5:56 
 "Freedom" [How Long Mix] – 4:09 
 "Something Got Me Started" [Perfecto Mix] – 5:10 
 "Thrill Me" [Nellee Hooper's Dub Mix] – 4:28 
 "Thrill Me" [Stewart Levine's Club Mix] (iTunes Only Track) – 6:56

Disc three (DVD)
Live at Montreux Jazz Festival (8 July 1992)

 "Love for Sale" (Cole Porter)
 "Drowning in My Own Tears" (Henry Glover)
 "Every Time We Say Goodbye" (Porter)
 "Sad Old Red" (Hucknall)
 "Grandma's Hands" (Bill Withers)
 "Enough" (Hucknall, Joe Sample)
 "If You Don't Know Me by Now" (Kenny Gamble, Leon Huff)
 "How Could I Fall" (Hucknall)
 "Lady Godiva's Room" (Hucknall)
 "A New Flame" (Hucknall)
 "Your Mirror" (Hucknall)
 "She's Got It Bad" (Hucknall)
 "Model" (Hucknall)
 "It's Only Love" (Jimmy Cameron, Vella Cameron)
 "Joy and Pain" (Frankie Beverly)
 "Come to My Aid" (Hucknall, McIntyre)
 "Infidelity" (Hucknall, Lamont Dozier)
 "The Right Thing" (Hucknall)
 "Holding Back the Years" (Hucknall, Neil Moss)
 "Stars" (Hucknall)
 "Open Up the Red Box" (Hucknall)
 "Thrill Me" (Hucknall, McIntyre)
 "Money's Too Tight (To Mention)" (John Valentine, William Valentine)
 "For Your Babies" (Hucknall)
 "Something Got Me Started" (Hucknall, McIntyre)
Promotional videos
 "Something Got Me Started"
 "Stars"
 "For Your Babies"
 "Thrill Me"
 "Your Mirror"

Personnel 

Simply Red
 Mick Hucknall – lead vocals, backing vocals
 Fritz McIntyre – keyboards, backing vocals on "Freedom", additional vocals on "Something Got Me Started" and "Wonderland"
 Tim Kellett – keyboards
 Heitor TP – guitars
 Shaun Ward – bass 
 Gota – drums, percussion, programming
 Ian Kirkham – saxophones

Additional personnel
 Jess Bailey – keyboard programming

Production
 Producer – Stewart Levine
 Co-Producer – Mick Hucknall
 Album Coordination – Bob Harding
 Engineered and Mixed by Darren Klein
 Assistant Engineers – Sandro Franchin and Marnie Riley
 Recorded at Condulmer Recording Studios (Venice, Italy).
 Mixed at Conway Studios (Hollywood, CA).
 Mastered by Bernie Grundman at Bernie Grundman Mastering (Hollywood, CA).
 Art Direction and Photography – Zanna
 Management – Andy Dodd and Elliot Rashman at So What Arts, Ltd.

Charts

Weekly charts

Year-end charts

Certifications and sales

!scope="row"|Worldwide
|
|9,000,000 
|-

See also
List of best-selling albums in Germany
List of best-selling albums in the United Kingdom

References

External links
Albums at Simply Red official website

Simply Red albums
1991 albums
East West Records albums
Albums produced by Stewart Levine